Edward Brady may refer to:

Edward Thomas Brady (born 1943), American judge
Ed Brady (born 1962), American football player
Ed Brady (actor) (1889–1942), American film actor